Coloured is the second studio album by American singer and songwriter Priscilla Renea, released on June 22, 2018 through Thirty Tigers. The first two singles, "Gentle Hands" and "Heavenly," were released on April 6, 2018 with accompanying music videos. "Family Tree" was released on May 10, 2018 as the third official single from Coloured.

Background and recording
After nearly a decade focused on songwriting, Coloured marked Priscilla Renea's return to the public as an artist. Since releasing her debut album (Jukebox) in 2009, Renea had become an award-winning songwriter, with credits on "Timber" for Pitbull and Ke$ha, "Somethin' Bad" for Miranda Lambert, "California King Bed" for Rihanna, "Worth It" for Fifth Harmony, and "Don't Mind" for Mary J. Blige.

Renea's decision to title the album Coloured was called provocative by some, due to the racial stigma of the term "colored" in American history. In interviews, she explains that by spelling it with a "u," the word "our" appears in the middle as her statement of inclusivity.

As early as 2015, Renea spoke in interviews about her working on her forthcoming album. Renea continued songwriting, but no official music was released until "Kiss Me" in February 2017 and "Do Wut" in January 2018.

Coloured was written and recorded between Nashville and Los Angeles in 2016.

Composition and themes
Renea spent several months writing and recording the core records of Coloured at songwriter and "Heavenly" co-writer Brett James' converted barn recording studio. The 10-song collection brings together hip-hop producers (Honorable C.N.O.T.E, Curtis "Sauce" Wilson, Theron Feemster, Brett James) with Nashville songwriters (Ashley Gorley, Kevin Kadish). Coloured is a mix of classic R&B, dark-edged Country and Urban Soul songs that were inspired by incidents in Priscilla's childhood in rural Florida, relationships, and racial trauma. Guitar, piano, and violin can be heard throughout the record.

Release and promotion
On April 2, 2018, Renea revealed on Instagram that her second studio album would be released in Summer 2018. The following week Paper Magazine premiered two music videos for singles on her forthcoming album. Renea promoted the album with a special show at the Country Music Hall of Fame and Museum.

Singles
On April 6, 2018, Renea released "Gentle Hands" and "Heavenly", the first two singles from Coloured. Music videos for both singles premiered online via Paper Magazine. The third single from Coloured was released on May 10, 2018. "Family Tree" is an autobiographical track written by Renea about her distressed teenage years, and overcoming challenges within her family.

Track listing

Personnel
Performance credits
Priscilla Renea – vocals 
Erick Walls – bass, guitar
Bianca McClure – violin
Theron Feemster – piano
Matt Bubel – drums
Mark Prentice – bass
Russ Pahl – acoustic guitar, steel guitar
Adam Shoenfeld – electric guitar
Jeffery Roach – piano
Frank Romano – steel guitar

Technical credits
Boots Ottestad – engineer
Sauce – engineer
Brandon Wood – engineer
Kyle Mann – engineer
Priscilla Renea – engineer

References 

2018 albums
Albums produced by Honorable C.N.O.T.E.
Albums produced by Supa Dups
Muni Long albums
Americana albums
Southern soul albums
Country albums by American artists